The Ateneo Puertorriqueño (Puerto Rican Athenaeum), is a cultural institution in Puerto Rico. Founded on April 30, 1876, it has been called Puerto Rico's oldest cultural institution, however, it is actually its third oldest overall and second culturally, after the Bar Association of Puerto Rico and the Casino of Mayagüez.

One of its founders was the playwright, Alejandro Tapia y Rivera. The Athenaeum was the first to give accolades and awards to artists and writers such as José Gautier Benítez, José de Diego, Manuel María Sama, Francisco Oller, Manuel Fernández Juncos, Lola Rodríguez de Tió and Luis Lloréns Torres.

The Athenaeum serves as a museum, school, library, and performance hall for the arts in Puerto Rico. It hosts a number of contests, conferences, and exhibits each year, presenting Puerto Rican art, literature, and music. Since 1937 the use of the spaces of the Athenaeum has been limited to activities it sponsors.  Its headquarters are located in Puerta de Tierra, adjacent to Old San Juan, in a strip that also houses the "Casa de España", the Carnegie Library, the Capitol complex and the Puerto Rico Olympic Committee headquarters.

History
The Atheaneaum was founded on Sunday, April 30, 1876 at San Juan City Hall. One of its founders was the playwright, Alejandro Tapia y Rivera. The Athenaeum was the first to give accolades and awards to artists and writers such as José Gautier Benítez, José de Diego, Manuel María Sama, Francisco Oller, Manuel Fernández Juncos, Lola Rodríguez de Tió and Luis Lloréns Torres.

Nilita Vientós Gastón became its first female president in 1946 and was the incumbent until 1961. In 1976 the Athenaeum celebrated its centennial with Eladio Rodríguez Otero at the helm as president, who gave a speech in presence of the then governor Rafael Hernández Colón, Hiram Torres Rigual, in representation of the Supreme Court of Puerto Rico, and former governor Luis A. Ferré. To commemorate the event, the Athenaeum also commissioned a medal to be awarded to those who represent "the highest national values expressed through [Puerto Rican] culture." The Centennial Medal of the Puerto Rican Athenaeum was most recently awarded to the musical salsa group El Gran Combo.

The Athenaeum Building 
In 1922 the Aguadillan architect, Francisco Roldán Arce was asked to draw up plans for the present building. The cornerstone was laid on 27 May 1923 in the presence of José Coll y Cuchi. The architecture of the building, Spanish Morisco, was introduced to Puerto Rico by Pedro de Castro, who also built some of the structures that neighbor close by. De Castro's tropical and mediterranean conscience objected to the architecture imported from the north, giving preference to the luminosity of the Caribbean, to the visual continuity of the spaces, to the galleries and balconies that served as a transition between interior and exterior spaces, shaped by the urban environment, the countryside or the inner courtyards.

The Athenaeum Art Gallery 
The Athenaeum's pride is its gallery of art, which consists of 459 artworks. Among the artworks held at the Atheneum one of its most recognizable is Francisco Oller's 1890 painting "La Escuela del Maestro Rafael Cordero".

Membership 

The membership of the Athenaeum is divided between four classes:

 Founders-48 inscribed before the inauguration of the institution. 
 Of Merit-Those who gave services to the Atheneaum. 
 Of Number 
 Accidentals-Those who pay their monthly dues.

Faculty 
The Puerto Rican Atheneum names members of Puerto Rico's cultural community to endowed chairs which cover a broad spectrum.

Experimental Theatre of the Athenaeum 
The Athenaeum commenced its work with theater under the auspices of Alejandro Tapia y Rivera and took course with the contests it has held since 1911. Emilio S. Belaval founded the first professional theater groups in 1938. The Experimental Theatre of the Puerto Rican Antheneaum was founded in 1952 as the first incumbent company of the institution. As such, one of the greatest Puerto Rican playwrights of the twentieth century, René Marqués, commences a dissemination and creative project of drama that continues to this day, totaling over 500 productions and 26 Avant-Garde Theatre Festivals.

Many participants of the Festivals are members of Puerto Rico's thespian community. The Experimental Theatre Hall, which has capacity for 200, has been the premiere of many works that are now considered classical Puerto Rican drama. The most well-known of these is René Marqués' La Carreta, which premiered in 1953 under the patronage of the Athenaeum. Other dramatists of note whose work has also premiered have been Manuel Méndez Ballester, Francisco Arriví, Luis Rafael Sánchez and Myrna Casa.

Theatre Festivals 
Started in the 1970s, the Theatre Festivals of the Puerto Rican Athenaeum with the intent of showcasing new works, both Puerto Rican, as well as of foreign extraction. Between 1973 and 2003 there were 36 editions of the Theatre Festival. During each edition approximately 10 productions were presented, except in the XIX Edition, where twenty works took place, of which fifteen young authors or Puerto Rican authors of note, and the XX edition, which premiered 26 plays.

Music Chair 
The Music Chair was one of the first created in the Twentieth century. It is in charge of the String Quartet of the Atheneaum.

Contemporary Puerto Rican Music Festival 
Started in 2005, it has had eight editions.

Cinema and Video Chair 
Created in 1985, the Cinema and Video Chair is dedicated to the development of the production of film in Puerto Rico. It also encourages the development of plans and infrastructure for the financing of the local cinematographic industry.

To date, it has produced two feature-length films.

The “Decolonization Torch” 
The sculptor José Buscaglia Guillermety designed and created a sculpture titled "La Antorcha de Descolonización" (English: Decolonization Torch). Its purpose being to "leave consigned our right and our interest in a non-colonial political status."

It was inaugurated by the then president of the Atheneaum, Eduardo Morales Coll, on the night of 24–25 July 2007 in front of the Atheneaum Building, where it will remain until the United States propitiates the opportunity for Puerto Rico to resolve its problems as a colony.  Political, cultural and sports figures participated in the inaugural ceremony.

The cauldron has the engraved phrase "Fin a la Colonia" (English: End to the Colony).

Wakes at the Atheneaum 
Many wakes have been held at the Atheneaum.

Wednsdeay, 4 March 2015, from 10:00 a.m. till 2:00 p.m. the actor Braulio Castillo, The Athenaeum is custodian of the film library and documentation of the actor's career.

March 2017 from 1:00 p.m. onward actress and writer Brunilda García.

7 November 2019 from 10:00 till 2:00 p.m. the television astrologer Walter Mercado Governor Wanda Vázquez Garced went and told the family she had decreed a one day of mourning.

During the morning of 3 January 2020 from 9:00 till midday of activist author Marisa Rosado of the Hostosian National Independence Movement, famed for her biography of Carlos Albizu Campos, was mourned there.

6 March 2020 from 1:00 p.m. till 6:00 p.m. Rafael Cancel Miranda. Maria Lourdes summoned female members of the PIP to receive him at the stairs in front.

References

External links
Information in Spanish, with photos
 The Rich Heritage of Ateneo Puertorriqueno
 Ateneo PR Archived Site
Statutes of the Puerto Rican Athenaeum (1876)
Statutes and Bylaws of the Puerto Rican Athenaeum (1900)
Statutes of the Puerto Rican Athenaeum (1909)

Cultural organizations based in Puerto Rico
Museums in San Juan, Puerto Rico
Theatres in Puerto Rico
History museums in Puerto Rico
1876 establishments in Puerto Rico
Museums established in 1876